Alexander Dzhaparidze (born 20 July 1955 , Makhachkala, Dagestan Autonomous Soviet Socialist Republic , Soviet Union) is a Russian-Georgian businessman based in London.  

Dzhaparidze is former owner of the PetroAlliance Services Company Limited, Russia's largest independent oilfield services company. 

In 2014 Dzhaparidze founded and chaired Eurasia Drilling Company Limited. Schlumberger attempted to acquire EDC in 2015 and 2018 but the acquisition was blocked by Russian Anti-Monopoly Service (FAS). In 2022, Dzhaparidze exited all Russian assets, including OOO BKE. 

In 2020, Forbes estimated Dzhaparidze's net worth to be US$1.2 billion and ranked him 1730th on the list of world billionaires.

In 2015, his company Soma Oil and Gas was probed by the British government for bribes in the acquisition of oil extraction rights in Somalia. The investigation was closed in 2016.

Activities 
 Chairman of the Board of Directors of OOO BKE 2005-march2022 
 CEO of Eurasia Drilling Company. 
 President of PetroAlliance Service Company 
 Executive BoD Chairman of PetroAlliance Service Company 
 Managing Director of JV MD SEIS

References 

1955 births
Russian businesspeople in the oil industry
Businesspeople from Georgia (country)
Billionaires from Georgia (country)
Living people